The following is a list of University College Dublin people, including notable alumni and faculty members of University College Dublin, a constituent university of the National University of Ireland.

Alumni

Literature
 Maeve Binchy, author
 Sarah Rees Brennan
 Gabriel Byrne
 Marina Carr
 Austin Clarke
 Benjamin Cleary
 Brian Cleeve
 Brian Coffey
 Eamon Delaney
 Denis Devlin
 Emma Donoghue
 Roddy Doyle (Paddy Clarke Ha Ha Ha)
 Paul Durcan
 Brendan Gleeson 
 Michael Hartnett
 Desmond Hogan
 Gerard Manley Hopkins
 John Jordan
 Neil Jordan, Oscar winner, (The Crying Game) 
 James Joyce, author of Ulysses
 Trevor Joyce
 Thomas Kilroy
 Mary Lavin
 Princess Mako of Akishino
 Hugh McFadden
 John McGahern
 Frank McGuinness
 Conor McPherson
 John Montague
 Flann O'Brien (At Swim-Two-Birds)
 Kate O'Brien
 Carroll O'Connor
 Joseph O'Connor
 Ulick O'Connor
 Chris O'Dowd
 Dan O'Herlihy
 Seán Ó Faoláin
 Liam O'Flaherty
 Nuala O Faolain
 Brian O'Nolan, writer, At Swim-Two-Birds
 Emily O'Reilly
 Keith Ridgway
 Jim Sheridan (My Left Foot)
 Colm Tóibín (The Master)

Journalism
 Vincent Browne
 Ruth Dudley Edwards
 Sally Hayden journalist
 Hugh McFadden
 Kevin Myers
 Doireann Ní Bhriain
 Kevin O'Sullivan, editor of The Irish Times
 Fintan O'Toole
 Caitriona Palmer
 Conor Ryan
 Maev-Ann Wren

Business

 Sharon Donnery, Irish economist and financial regulator 
 Niall FitzGerald, former CEO of Unilever
 Aidan Heavey, CEO of Tullow Oil
 Gary McGann chairman of Flutter Entertainment, and former CEO of Smurfit Kappa and Aer Lingus
 Ann O'Dea, CEO of Inspirefest
 Tony O'Reilly, owner of Independent News and Media
 Denis O'Brien, owner of Communicorp and Digicel
 David J. O'Reilly, Chairman and CEO of Chevron Corporation
 Dalton Philips, CEO of Morrisons
 Mark Pollock
 Feargal Quinn, former owner of Superquinn, and Senator
 Peter Sutherland, former Director General of the World Trade Organization; former Chairman of British Petroleum; Chairman of Goldman Sachs Europe; served as Ireland's Attorney General and European Commissioner

Science and technology
 Conrad Burke, entrepreneur
Rónadh Cox, Irish geologist, Brust Professor of Geology and Mineralogy at Williams College and Fellow of the Geological Society of America
 Evelyn Cusack former Secretary of the Irish Meteorological Society.
Conor P. Delaney, Irish-American colorectal surgeon known for developing enhanced recovery pathways
Dervilla M. X. Donnelly, Irish chemist
Orla Feely, Vice President for Research, Innovation and Impact and Professor of Electronic Engineering at University College Dublin, and Fellow of the Institute of Electrical and Electronics Engineers
 Garret A. FitzGerald Irish pharmacologist
 Edmond Harty CEO and technical director of Dairymaster,
 Tony Holohan, Chief Medical Officer of Ireland
 Mary Horgan, Irish physician and president of the Royal College of Physicians of Ireland
 Teresa Lambe, co-developer of Oxford–AstraZeneca COVID-19 vaccine
 Eleanor Maguire Irish neuropsychologist
 Julie McEnery American astrophysicist
 Eilis McGovern, Irish professor of cardiothoracic surgery, President of RCSI, and first female President of any Royal College of Surgeons in the world
 Anne Merriman British doctor, founded Hospice Africa Uganda
 John Monahan, bioscientist and CEO of Avigen Inc in California, a NASDAQ company
 Thomas E. Nevin, Irish physicist and Dean of the Faculty of Science 1963 to 1979
 John James Nolan, Irish physicist and President of the Royal Irish Academy
 Patrick Joseph Nolan, Irish atmospheric physicist
 Daniel Joseph Kelly O'Connell, SJ, astronomer and seismologist, Director of Riverview and the Vatican Observatory, president of the Pontifical Academy of Sciences(1968-72), O'Connell effect named after him.
 Cormac O'Raifeartaigh, Irish physicist and philosopher of science
 David J. O'Reilly former chairman and CEO of Chevron Corporation
 Delia Grace Randolph
 Michael J. Ryan (doctor) Irish epidemiologist and former trauma surgeon

Mathematics
 Seán Dineen, mathematician known for results in complex analysis. 
 Thomas J. Laffey, Mathematician known for group theory and matrix theory
 Peter Lynch, Mathematician, meteorologist, book author and Irish Times columnist
 Henry Charles McWeeney, Mathematician who served as vice president of UCD from 1909 to 1935
 Colm Mulcahy, Mathematician known for his chronicling of Irish mathematicians throughout history

Finance and banking
 Patrick Honohan, Governor of the Central Bank of Ireland

Politics and government

Heads of state
 V. V. Giri, 4th President of India (did not graduate)
 Patrick Hillery, 6th President of Ireland
 Douglas Hyde, 1st President of Ireland, Professor of Irish
 Cearbhall Ó Dálaigh, 5th president of Ireland

Heads of government
 John Bruton, 9th Taoiseach of Ireland
 John A. Costello, 2nd Taoiseach of Ireland
 Brian Cowen, 11th Taoiseach of Ireland
 Garret FitzGerald, 7th Taoiseach of Ireland
 Charles Haughey, 6th Taoiseach of Ireland

Other Political Leaders
 Mairead McGuinness, European Commissioner

Military
 Michael Beary, Irish Army Major General and Commander of UNIFIL

Other

 Dermot Ahern
 Anne Anderson, Irish Ambassador to the United States
 David Andrews
 Kevin Barry
 Séamus Brennan
 Richard Bruton
 Joan Burton
 Eibhlin Byrne
 Mella Carroll
 Hazel Chu
 Ruth Coppinger former TD for Dublin West
 Patrick Costello
 Mary Coughlan
 Ryan Crocker, former United States Ambassador to Iraq; recipient of the Presidential Medal of Freedom
 Catherine Day, Secretary-General of the European Commission
 Ann Derwin, Ireland's Ambassador to China
 Síle de Valera
 Noel Dempsey
 Professor James Dooge, former Minister of Foreign Affairs; European Union architect; climatologist; Professor of Civil Engineering at UCD for several years
 Alan Dukes
 Martin Fraser
 Dermot Gallagher, Secretary-General of the Department of Foreign Affairs
 Aideen Hayden former Irish Labour Party politician
 Joe Higgins, former Socialist Party TD & MEP
 Justin Keating
 Vincent Keaveny Lawyer and 693rd Lord Mayor of London
 Hugh Kennedy
 Noël A. Kinsella, 46th Speaker of the Senate of Canada
 Michael Kitt
 Brian Lenihan
 Thomas MacDonagh
 Charlie McCreevy; former European Commissioner for Internal Market & Services
 Alasdair McDonnell former SDLP leader and MP for Belfast South
 Michael McDowell; former Tánaiste and Minister for Justice, Equality and Law Reform
 Mairead McGuinness Irish politician serving as the European Commissioner for Financial Stability, Financial Services and the Capital Markets Union
 Paul Murphy TD for Dublin South West, former MEP
 John L. Murray
 Michael Noonan
 Éamon Ó Cuív
 Willie O'Dea
 Kevin O'Higgins
 Mary O'Rourke
 Nóirín O'Sullivan
 Nora Owen
 Patrick Pearse
 Ruairi Quinn
 Neale Richmond
 James Ryan
 Francis Skeffington
 Eóin Tennyson; Alliance Party MLA for Upper Bann
 Michael Woods
 Robert Watt (Irish civil servant)

Legal
 Caoilfhionn Gallagher barrister
 Paul Gallagher, former Attorney General
 Dermot Gleeson barrister
 Anthony J. Hederman
 Ronan Keane
 Hugh Kennedy, first Chief Justice of the State
 Cecil Lavery
 John L. Murray

Academia
 Thom Brooks, philosopher and legal academic
 Remi Chandran, researcher
 Anthony Clare, psychiatrist
 John Coakley, political scientist
 Arthur W. Conway, physicist
 Patrick Cosgrave, historian
 Deirdre Curtin, lawyer
 James Dooge, engineer
 Owen Dudley Edwards, historian
 Robert Dudley Edwards, historian
 Yvonne Farrell architect and academic
 John D. FitzGerald, economist
 Noel Fitzpatrick, veterinarian
 Roy C. Geary, statistician
 Aoife Gowen, researcher
 Dennis Jennings (Internet pioneer)
 Thomas Kettle, economist
 John Francis Leader, psychologist
 Eoin MacNeill, scholar
 J. A. McClelland, physicist
 Páid McGee, psychologist
 Shelley McNamara architect and academic
 Thomas Preston, physicist
 Frances P. Ruane, economist
 Martin J. Tobin Irish-American critical care physician, pulmonologist
 Desmond Williams, historian

Engineers
 Thomas McLaughlin, key player in the construction of the Ardnacrusha power plant, the largest hydroelectric plant in the world when constructed
 Eddie O'Connor, founder of Mainstream Renewable Energy
 William F. Roe, electrical engineer; led the rural electrification scheme in Ireland
 J.O.(Seán) Scanlan, circuit theory; gold medalist of the IEEE Circuits and Systems Society

Arts

 Joanne McNally, comedian 
 Consolata Boyle, costume designer
 Paul Brady
 Niall Breslin, musician
 Gabriel Byrne
 Graham Cantwell
 Benjamin Cleary, Oscar winner
 Cyril Cusack
 Barbara Dawson, director of Hugh Lane Gallery, Dublin
 Foil Arms and Hog, Irish sketch comedy group.
 Brendan Gleeson
 Róisín Heneghan, architect and designer
 Amy Huberman
 Neil Jordan, film director, screenwriter, novelist and short story writer
 Roisin Kennedy, art critic and curator
 Pat Kenny, broadcaster, former host of The Late Late Show
 Rosaleen Linehan, actress
 Dominique McElligott, actor
 Hugh McFadden
 Michael McGlynn, Irish composer
 David McNulty, architect
 Kieron Moore
 Dermot Morgan, actor best known as Father Ted
 Dara Ó Briain, Mock the Week, Have I Got News For You, QI, Three Men in a Boat
 Miriam O'Callaghan, Irish television current affairs presenter with RTÉ
 Carroll O'Connor
 Chris O'Dowd, The IT Crowd, Bridesmaids, Girls, Moone Boy
 Dan O'Herlihy, Academy Award-nominated actor
 Kevin Roche, architect
 Jim Sheridan
 Bill Shipsey
 Ryan Tubridy, host of The Late Late Show
 Bill Whelan, composer and musician
 Colette Wong, presenter of Fox Sports Central Asia

Clergy
 Desmond Connell, Cardinal, Archbishop of Dublin
 Diarmuid Martin, Archbishop of Dublin
 Fr. Malachi Martin S.J., author
 Saint John Henry Newman, Cardinal, educator, writer
 Tomás Ó Fiaich, Cardinal, Archbishop of Armagh
 Maurice Piat CSSp, GCSK, Cardinal, Archbishop of Port Louis, Mauritius
 Dermot Ryan, Archbishop of Dublin, Professor of Oriental Languages

Sports

Soccer
Alan Cawley, retired professional footballer
Tony McDonnell, retired professional footballer
David McMillan, striker for Dundalk FC
Evan McMillan, defender for Sligo Rovers
Conor Sammon, Irish International, striker for Derby County

Hockey
 Emily Beatty, Irish International hockey player
 Deirdre Duke, Irish International hockey player
 Nicola Evans, Irish International hockey player
 Katie Mullen, Irish International hockey player
 Anna O'Flanagan, Irish International hockey player
 Gillian Pinder, Irish International hockey player

Rugby 
 Patrick Casey, former Irish International
 Leo Cullen (rugby union), Coach of Leinster rugby team
 Gordon D'Arcy, Irish rugby international, British and Irish Lions
 Mick Doyle, Irish rugby international player and coach, British and Irish Lions
 Tony Ensor, former Irish rugby international
 Luke Fitzgerald, Ireland international and the British and Irish Lions
 Denis Hickie, former Irish rugby international, British and Irish Lions
 Rob Kearney, Ireland International and the British and Irish Lions
 Ray McLoughlin, Ireland international and British and Irish Lions
 Brian O'Driscoll, captain of the Irish rugby team, British and Irish Lions
 Conor O'Shea, Irish rugby international and director of rugby at Harlequin F.C.
 Johnny Sexton, Irish rugby union player
 Fergus Slattery, Ireland international and the British and Irish Lions
 Cillian Willis, currently playing for Connacht Rugby
 Nichola Fryday, Ireland Captain for the 2022 Women’s Six Nations campaign

Rowing 
 Eimear Lambe  2020 Summer Olympics bronze medalist 
 Paul O'Donovan, Olympic gold medallist in lightweight double sculls

Horse Racing 
 Dermot Weld former jockey and one of Ireland's most successful racehorse trainers.

GAA
 Rena Buckley Cork dual Gaelic football/camogie player
 Brian Dooher
 Cormac McAnallen
 Jack McCaffrey Gaelic footballer
 Kevin O'Flanagan
 Mícheál Ó Muircheartaigh Irish Gaelic games commentator
 Colm O'Rourke Gaelic football manager
 Derval O'Rourke
 Jason Sherlock

Swimming
 Michelle Smith

Fictional
 Brother Barnabas
 Stephen Dedalus
 Ross O'Carroll-Kelly

Humanitarians
 Fr. Aengus Finucane, missionary, one of the founders of Concern Worldwide
 Sr. Stanislaus Kennedy, founder of Focus Ireland
 Sr. Maura Lynch,  Irish doctor, a nun, and proponent of women's health in Africa
 Fr. Peter McVerry SJ, founder of the Peter McVerry Trust is a science graduate.
 Sr. Mary Aquinas Monaghan, Columban missionary in China and Hong Kong, a specialist in the treatment and management of tuberculosis.
 Sr. Lucy O'Brien, missionary nun and medical doctor in Africa.
 John O'Shea, humanitarian, founder of GOAL
 Sr. Mona Tyndall, medical doctor and missionary nun in Nigeria and Zambia

Faculty
Aoife Ahern
Hugh Brady
Linda Cardinal
Gerard Casey
Terence Dolan
Orla Feely
Robert Gerwarth
James J. Heckman
Caroline Hussey
Mark Keane
Declan Kiberd
Sinisa Malesevic
Stephen Mennell
Edna O'Brien
Da-Wen Sun
Joseph Watson
Christopher T. Whelan

See also
 List of NUI Galway people

References

University College Dublin
Dublin, University College